An online office suite, online productivity suite or cloud office suite is an office suite offered in the form of a web application. It is accessed online using a web browser. This allows people to work together worldwide and at any time, thereby leading to web-based collaboration and virtual teamwork. Some online office suites can be installed  on-premises, while other are offered only as software as a service. Of the latter, basic versions can be offered for free, while more advanced versions are often made available with a subscription fee. The latest offerings have been created to run as pure HTML5 web pages, known as progressive web applications, no longer requiring a cloud or online connection to function. Online office suites exist as both, proprietary and open-source software.

Components

An online office suite may include a broad set of applications, such as the following:

Document creation and editing applications
Word processor
Spreadsheet
Presentation program
Notetaking
Diagramming tool
Raster graphics editor

Publishing applications
Content management system
Web portal
Wiki
Blog
Forums

Collaborative applications
Webmail
Instant messaging (voice over IP)
Calendar

Management applications
Data management
Project management
Customer relationship management
Enterprise resource planning
Accounting

Advantages

The cost is low. In most cases, there is no specific charge for using the service for users who already have access to a computer with a web browser and a connection to the Internet.
There is no need to download or install software outside of the office suite’s web page, including the ongoing upgrade chores of adding new features to or eliminating bugs from the office suite.
Online office suites can run on thin clients with minimal hardware requirements.
Online office suites provide the ability for a group of people to share a document without the need to run their own server.
There is no need to purchase or upgrade a software license. Instead, the online office suite is available in the form of software as a service.
Online office suites are portable. Users can access their documents from almost any device with a connection to the Internet, regardless of which operating system they use.
If the user’s computer fails, the documents are still safely stored on the remote server. Online service providers' backup processes and overall stability will generally be superior to that of most home systems.

Disadvantages
Access requires connectivity—if the remote server or network is unavailable, the content will also be unavailable. However, in many cases, the online suite will allow the user to regularly backup data or even provide synchronization of documents between the server and the local computer.
There are speed and accessibility issues. Most of the available online office suites require a high speed (broadband) Internet connection. That can be a problem for users who are limited by a slower connection to the Internet.
The number of features available is an issue. Online office suites tend to lack the more advanced features available on their offline counterparts.
In the long term, if there is a subscription charge to use the service, the ongoing subscription cost may be more expensive than purchasing offline software upfront.
The user has no control over the version of the software used. If the software is changed the user is forced to use the changed version, even if the changed version is less suited to the user.
The user is reliant on the service provider for security and privacy of their documents.

References

 
Online word processors
Online spreadsheets
2000s neologisms